This is a list of films produced by the Ollywood film industry based in Bhubaneshwar and Cuttack in 1949:

A-Z

References

1949
Ollywood
Films, Ollywood
1940s in Orissa